Estádio dos Coqueiros is a multi-use stadium in Luanda, Angola.  It is currently used mostly for football matches and is the home ground of Benfica de Luanda and Kabuscorp.  The stadium holds 12,000 people and was built during the colonial period, in 1947. It underwent major renovation works in 2005.

References

External links
 Facebook profile

Buildings and structures in Luanda
Buildings and structures completed in 2005
Coqueiros
Sport in Luanda